Trần Tế Xương (chu Han 陳濟昌) also known by the pen name Tú Xương (Mặc Trai, Mộng Tích, Tử Thịnh 11 June 1870 - 29 January 1907) was a Vietnamese poet and satirist. His poems and literary works frequently targeted the gallicization of the Vietnamese middle classes.

References

External links

Vietnamese male poets
1870 births
1907 deaths
19th-century Vietnamese poets
19th-century male writers